is a Japanese mountain located on the border of Komono, Mie Prefecture and Higashi-Ōmi, Shiga Prefecture.

This mountain is the center of Suzuka Quasi-National Park.

Outline
Mount Gozaisho is one of the highest mountains in the Suzuka Mountain Range between Mie and Shiga.  The Gozaisho Ropeway connects the top of the mountain to the Yunoyama Hot Springs.  Gozaisho is a gate to the other mountains in the Suzuka range.

Nature
Mount Gozaisho is famous for the sharp outlook of the mountains and rich nature.

Resort
On the top of the mountain, there's a small skiing resort which is the closest such resort to the Nagoya metropolitan area.

Access
Yunoyama-Onsen Station, terminus of the Kintetsu Yunoyama Line.
Takehira Pass by car.

Gallery

References
Official Home Page of the Geographical Survey Institute in Japan
Keizo Kusakawa, Gozaisho, Ryozen, Ibuki, Shobunsha, 2007

Gozaisho
Gozaisho